"Did It in a Minute" is a song performed by American musical duo Hall & Oates. Written by member Daryl Hall with Sara and Janna Allen, the song was released as the third of four singles from their tenth studio album Private Eyes in March 1982. Daryl Hall performs lead vocals, while John Oates provides backing harmony vocals.

Background
The song was inspired by the 1977 Eric Carmen hit "She Did It", because of the 'did-its' in the song. Carmen was touring with Hall & Oates at the time "Did It in a Minute" became a hit.  "She Did It" itself had been inspired by the 'did-its' in the Beach Boys' tune, "Do It Again"

Record World called it a "hook-filled pop piece."

Chart performance
"Did It in a Minute" peaked at number nine on the United States Billboard Hot 100, becoming one of three top ten singles from Private Eyes.

Weekly charts

Year-end charts

Popular culture
In an episode of SCTV Network that aired on 5 June 1982, this song was performed by the duo (with their band).

References

External links
 

1982 singles
1981 songs
Hall & Oates songs
Songs written by Daryl Hall
RCA Records singles
Songs written by Sara Allen
Songs written by Janna Allen
American soft rock songs